Luciano Zinali (born 13 August 1943) is an Italian former yacht racer who competed in the 1972 Summer Olympics and the 1976 Summer Olympics. He was born in Piombino, Italy.

Olympic events 
1972 Summer Olympics in Munich, competing with Carlo Croce for Italy:
 Flying Dutchman – 11th place of 29 teams

1976 Summer Olympics in Montreal, competing with Carlo Croce for Italy:
 Flying Dutchman – 16th place of 20 teams

References

1943 births
Living people
Italian male sailors (sport)
Olympic sailors of Italy
Sailors at the 1972 Summer Olympics – Flying Dutchman
Sailors at the 1976 Summer Olympics – Flying Dutchman
People from Piombino
Sportspeople from the Province of Livorno